Bharat-Bangladesh Maitri Udyan in Chottakhola was one of the base camps of Bangladeshi Freedom Fighters from where they launched guerrilla warfare against the Pakistani army in Chittagong, Comilla and greater Noakhali.

Location 
Located near the international border, the Maitri Udyan is a park built at Chottakhola as a tribute to the Bangladeshi Freedom Fighters and Indian soldiers, who sacrificed their lives during the Liberation War. A war museum, hillocks, verdant valleys, lakes, plants, sculptures, graveyards of Bangladeshi Freedom Fighters with various other elements, this is not just a park but much more than that.

History 
The memorial park was a long cherished demand of Tripura people as they were actively involved in the Liberation War. They provided all-out support to Freedom Fighters and sheltered around 1.6 million people, a number exceeding the then population of the state. Chottakhola, 130 kilometres from Tripura's capital Agartala, had functioned as one of the 11 warfront-camps in Tripura in 1971. The beautiful location comprises seven hillocks partly separated by a natural lake over 20 hectares of land. It saw intense activities during the Liberation War and still bears its memorabilia in the form of remnants of a number of bunkers and trenches built on it in 1971.

Inauguration 
Former Tripura Chief Minister Manik Sarkar inaugurated the memorial and park in the presence of Indian and Bangladeshi artists, intellectuals and freedom fighters on December 16, the Victory Day of Bangladesh. The then Bangladesh's Education Minister Dipu Moni laid the foundation stone of the park on 11 November 2010.

Statues 
 Prime Minister Indira Gandhi
 Founder of Bangladesh- Bangabandhu Sheikh Mujibur Rahman  
 Bijoy 1971
 Gonohotta 1971 
 Terracotta

Artists and sculptors 
Renowned artists from Tripura and Bangladesh are part of the project with their creations - from statues to paintings -that added to the memorial's attraction.

Bangladeshi artists and sculptors  

 Hashem Khan 
 Mahmudul Hasan Shohag 
 Shyamal Chowdhury
 Tejosh Halder Josh
depicted sculptures for the park.

The memorial park would help successive generations of Bangladesh learn the history of their hard-won independence and how the two friendly neighbours joined forces to bring about the country's liberation.

References 

Monuments and memorials in India
Architecture in Bangladesh
Modernist architecture
Bangladesh Liberation War
Buildings and structures in Tripura
Sculptures by Mahmudul Hasan Shohag
South Tripura district